Gwyn "Jocko" Thomas (August 16, 1913 – May 5, 2010) was a crime reporter with CFRB and the Toronto Star.

Born in Toronto, Thomas began his news career as a newsboy at the corner of Bathurst Street and Bloor Street in 1925. After one year of high school, Thomas was hired by the Toronto Star as a copyboy in 1929. He worked his way as a general reporter in the early 1930s to becoming the paper's crime reporter by 1939. In the 1960s, Thomas entered a new medium by becoming a radio crime reporter on CFRB.

Thomas' career involved covering the minor criminal activities in Toronto's suburbs, but also famous criminal stories:

 Christie Pits race riots in 1933.
 Stanley Buckowski on death row at California's San Quentin prison (1951); and execution 1952.
 Boyd Gang

Widely remembered for his unique sign-off at the end of his live radio news reports: "This is Jocko Thomas of The Toronto Star reporting to CFRB... from police headquarters."

Retired in 1989, Thomas died at a long-term care facility in North York at the age of 96.

Awards
 National Newspaper Awards (3)
 local police reporting awards (9)
 member of the Canadian News Hall of Fame (1995)

References

1913 births
2010 deaths
Canadian newspaper reporters and correspondents
Canadian radio reporters and correspondents
People from Toronto